Largent v. Texas, 318 U.S. 418 (1943), was a case involving Jehovah's Witnesses in which the Supreme Court of the United States held that a city ordinance of Paris, Texas, requiring permits in order to solicit orders for books is unconstitutional as applied to the distribution of religious publications. The church members were represented by Hayden C. Covington.

See also 
 Jamison v. State of Texas: A similar case in Dallas

References

External links
 
 

1943 in United States case law
United States Supreme Court cases
United States Supreme Court cases of the Stone Court
United States Free Speech Clause case law
United States free exercise of religion case law
Jehovah's Witnesses litigation in the United States
Paris, Texas
Christianity and law in the 20th century
1943 in religion